Wereham, Priory of St. Winwaloe was a priory in Wereham, Norfolk, England. It became Winnold House.

References

Monasteries in Norfolk